The 1999 Ugandan Super League was the 32nd season of the official Ugandan football championship, the top-level football league of Uganda.

Overview
The 1999 Uganda Super League was contested by 20 teams and was won by SC Villa, while Maji, UNNATO FC, Posta, Pamba, Rwampara FC, Roraima FC, Gulu United FC and Rockstars were relegated.

League standings

Leading goalscorer
The top goalscorer in the 1999 season was Andrew Mukasa of SC Villa with 45 goals. 'Fimbo' holds the record for the greatest number of league goals scored in a single season.

Footnotes

External links
Uganda - List of Champions - RSSSF (Hans Schöggl)
Ugandan Football League Tables - League321.com

Ugandan Super League seasons
1
Uganda
Uganda